The Taipei International Invitational Futsal Tournament was held from October 27 to October 29, 2006 at Taipei Gymnasium in Taipei, Taiwan. It was the first international futsal event in Taipei after holding the 2004 FIFA Futsal World Championship. Finally, Japanese D.C Asahikawa Futsal Club beat Macau, Chinese Taipei, and Taipei Select team and won the first place. 

Before the tournament was held, the organizers originally wanted to invite Korea national team as well as Macau national team and D.C Asahikawa. However, the Korea team declined the invitation, and thus Taipei Futsal Association's select team was included as the replacement.

In December, Chinese Taipei Football Association was fined US$ 10,000 by AFC Disciplinary Committee for failing to seek the AFC’s approval for the tournament which violates Article 11-V (Tournaments) of the Regulations governing the application of AFC Statutes ‘All tournaments involving more than two local or national teams (clubs or representative teams) which belong to difference member associations must be approved by the Confederation.'

Tournament table

Results

See also
 Chinese Taipei Football Association
 Taipei Football Association
 Macau Football Association
 List of sporting events in Taiwan

References

External links
 D.C Asahikawa Futsal Club official site
 News and photos at Futsal Planet

International futsal competitions hosted by Taiwan
Taipei International Invitational Futsal Tournament, 2006
2006 in Asian futsal
2006 in Macau football
2006 in Japanese football